Moudourou Swa-Moise (born 15 September 1985 in Douala) is a Cameroonian professional footballer. He currently plays for Thailand Premier League side Thai Port FC. as a commanding, physical centre back.

He picked up his first Thai winner's medal with Port as part of their 2009 Thai FA Cup championship squad, scoring during the decisive penalty shootout and earning a runner's-up award in the 2009 Thai Port player awards. In 2010 more success followed, with Port beating Buriram PEA F.C. for the 2010 Thai League Cup championship as well as the subsequent international 2011 Toyota Premier Cup against Shonan Bellmare.

References

1985 births
Living people
Cameroonian footballers
Moudourou Moise
Expatriate footballers in Thailand
Cameroonian expatriates in Singapore
Expatriate footballers in Malaysia
Cameroonian expatriate sportspeople in Thailand
Expatriate footballers in Singapore
Cameroonian expatriates in Malaysia
Hougang United FC players
Young Lions FC players
Singapore Premier League players
Moudourou Moise
Footballers from Douala
Association football defenders